Texmar United is a Belizean football team which currently competes in the Super League of Belize, Semipro Division.

Formerly known as Tex Mar Boys, the team is based in Mango Creek.  Their home stadium is Michael Ashcroft Stadium.

Current squad

See also 
 Super League of Belize

Football clubs in Belize
Super League of Belize
2006 establishments in Belize
Association football clubs established in 2006